The Job Knapp House is a historic house located at 81 Shores Street in Taunton, Massachusetts.

Description and history 
It is a -story wood-framed structure, five bays wide, with a side gable gambrel roof, a central chimney, and wood shingle siding. It has a narrow wood plank door flanked by sidelight windows. The house was built circa 1728, making it one of the oldest standing structures in the city. The gambrel roof is a particularly rare feature on houses of this period in Southeastern Massachusetts.

The house was added to the National Register of Historic Places on July 5, 1984.

See also
National Register of Historic Places listings in Taunton, Massachusetts

References

National Register of Historic Places in Taunton, Massachusetts
Houses in Taunton, Massachusetts
Houses on the National Register of Historic Places in Bristol County, Massachusetts
Colonial architecture in Massachusetts